The Bachelor Vietnam - Anh chàng độc thân (Single guy) is a Vietnamese reality television adaptation of the American series The Bachelor that debuted 14 August 2018 on Ho Chi Minh City Television channel 7 (HTV7).

Plot
The program has a format similar to the American version, with 24 women competing for a single man to be selected as his romantic partner. Through the series, he learns more about each contestant. At the end of each episode, the candidates will be awarded a rose by the bachelor, symbolizing their continued stay in the contest. On the other hand, candidates who do not receive a rose are eliminated and leave the program.

Seasons

Same-sex couple
The show garnered worldwide attention when contestant Minh Thu confessed her love for another contestant, Truc Nhu, instead of the show's "bachelor". 
While Nhu stayed on the show until her elimination, she and Minh got into a romantic relationship afterward.

References
 List of broadcasts on Ho Chi Minh City Television (HTV)

2018 Vietnamese television series debuts
Vietnamese-language television shows
Vietnam